Mardenborough is a surname. Notable people with the surname include:

Jann Mardenborough (born 1991), English racing driver
Steve Mardenborough (born 1964), English footballer